Sean nós refers to "old style" Irish song and dance, which are discussed under:
 Sean-nós singing, Irish traditional song
 Sean-nós dance, Irish traditional dance
 Sean-nós dance in United States, Irish traditional singing and dancing in the "old style" in the U.S.
 Sean Nós and Sean-nós Activities, Differentiating between Sean Nós and Sean-nós Activities

Irish music
Irish dance